Brian Jackson (born May 4, 1987) is a former American football cornerback. He was signed as an undrafted free agent by the New York Jets in 2010. He played college football at Oklahoma.

He has also played for the New York Giants and St. Louis Rams.

External links
Brian Jackson: Sooner Sports
New York Jets bio

Living people
1987 births
People from DeSoto, Texas
Players of American football from Texas
Oklahoma Sooners football players
American football cornerbacks
New York Jets players
New York Giants players
St. Louis Rams players
Sportspeople from the Dallas–Fort Worth metroplex